The Nantwich was a 40-gun Fourth rate frigate of the English Royal Navy, originally built for the navy of the Commonwealth of England at Bristol, and launched in 1654.

After the Restoration in 1660, she was renamed HMS Breda. She was wrecked in 1666.

Notes

References

Lavery, Brian (2003) The Ship of the Line - Volume 1: The development of the battlefleet 1650-1850. Conway Maritime Press. .

Ships of the line of the Royal Navy
Ships built in Bristol
Shipwrecks
1650s ships
17th-century maritime incidents
Maritime incidents in 1666